Otilonium bromide, sold under the trade name Spasmomen among others, is an antimuscarinic and calcium channel blocker used to relieve spasmodic pain of the gut, especially in irritable bowel syndrome.

Medical uses
A pooled analysis of three clinical trials suggest that otilonium is more effective than placebo for the treatment of irritable bowel syndrome.

Pharmacology
Otilinium binds to both muscarinic receptors and tachykinin NK2 receptors. It has been shown to inhibit L-type and T-type calcium channels, actions which may contribute to or determine its effects in the gut.

When taken orally, very little of the drug is absorbed into the rest of the body, which means that most of its actions remain confined to the gastrointestinal system.

References 

Muscarinic antagonists
Quaternary ammonium compounds
Phenol ethers
Benzanilides
4-Aminobenzoate esters
Bromides